"Thank You Baby! (For Makin' Someday Come So Soon)" is a song by Canadian singer Shania Twain. It was the fifth single from her fourth studio album Up! (2002). The song was written by Twain and her then-husband Mutt Lange. It was announced by Twain that "Thank You Baby!" would be the next single from Up! at her Kilkenny concert, her first concert since the Come On Over Tour. The song fared well on the charts, boosted by club play of the Almighty remixes. The European single was released on August 11, 2003 and the UK single on August 25, 2003. Twain performed the song on the Up! Tour.

Composition 
"Thank You Baby!" is performed in the key of G major in compound quadruple time with a tempo of 114 beats per minute. Twain's vocals span from G3 to E5.

Critical reception
Critical reception for "Thank You Baby!" was warm. About.com called the song a "nice mid-tempo ballad", while Rolling Stone magazine noted it conveyed "motherly intimacy and an undeniable pop sense".

Music video
The music video for "Thank You Baby!" was shot in Vancouver, British Columbia, Canada at First Light Film Studio by director Paul Boyd. It was originally released in Europe on July 28, 2003. The video was not released to North American stations. It is set in an art gallery, with three four-sided TVs stacked on top of each other in the middle of the room. Twain is singing on the TVs (her head on the top screen, her torso in the middle and her legs on the bottom), while the people in the gallery start noticing her and crowd around the TVs to watch. Also, paintings of an orchestra come to life to play along to the song. The video is available on select CD singles.

Chart performance 
"Thank You Baby!" proved to be less successful than the previous singles released from Up!, nevertheless it just missed the top ten in the UK when it debuted at its peak of number 11. It entered the chart on September 6, 2003, and remained on the chart for seven weeks. While it did break the streak of top ten singles at seven in the UK, it did become her tenth top 20 single. The song also hit the top 20 in Austria and Germany.

Track listings
These are the formats for major releases.

UK CD single - Part 1
"Thank You Baby!" (Red) - 4:04
"From This Moment On" (Live) - 4:15
"Thank You Baby!" (Green) - 4:03

UK CD singles - Part 2
"Thank You Baby!" (Red) - 4:04
"Thank You Baby!" (Almighty Mix) - 6:34
"Any Man of Mine" (Live) - 4:09
Enhanced: "Thank You Baby!" music video

Europe CD Maxi - Part 1
"Thank You Baby!" (Red) - 4:03
"Forever and for Always" (Red) - 4:46
"Any Man of Mine" (Live) - 4:20
"You're Still the One" (Live) - 3:26

Europe CD Maxi - Part 2
"Thank You Baby!" (Red) - 4:03
"Thank You Baby!" (Almighty Mix) - 6:35
"Thank You Baby!" (Green) - 4:04
Enhanced: "Thank You Baby!" music video

Germany 3" CD single
"Thank You Baby!" (Red) - 4:01
"Forever and for Always" (Red) - 4:44

Europe and France CD single
"Thank You Baby!" (Red) - 4:01
"Thank You Baby!" (Almighty Mix) - 6:30

Audio versions
Red Album Version (4:01)
Green Album Version (4:01)
Blue Album Version (4:01)
Almighty Mix (6:36)
Almighty Dub (6:33) 
Live from Up! Live in Chicago (4:12)

Charts

Release history

References

Shania Twain songs
2003 singles
Songs written by Robert John "Mutt" Lange
Song recordings produced by Robert John "Mutt" Lange
Songs written by Shania Twain
Mercury Records singles
Mercury Nashville singles
Music videos directed by Paul Boyd
2002 songs